Ludmilla Azova is a soprano opera singer who studied at the New York College of Music and has appeared as a soloist with the New York Philharmonic and the National Orchestra Association, and performed the role of Fiordiligi in Mozart's Così fan tutte with the Bermuda Festival Theatre. Other operatic roles performed in New York include Mimì in La bohème, Madama Butterfly and Marguerite in Faust. In 1966, she appeared as Anna Gomez in a production of Gian Carlo Menotti's The Consul at New York City Opera. Azova has also been an active recitalist. In a review, dated October 6, 1969, in The New York Times, Peter G. Davis wrote, "Ludmilla Azova brought a bright, silvery soprano and an abundance of authoritative style to her Russian song recital at Town Hall late yesterday afternoon. Born in Europe of Russian parents, Miss Azova clearly knows where of what she sings ... In addition to the charm and elegance of her interpretations, Miss Azova's well-schooled, even, secure soprano consistently delighted the ear ... She is a beautiful woman, a charming recitalist and a singer of accomplishment."

Recording
Music From The Orthodox Liturgy – Ludmilla Azova (soprano), Tamara Bering (alto), Slavonic Cappella Ensemble, Alexis P. Fekula (conductor). Label: ESP 1065

References

American operatic sopranos
Living people
Year of birth missing (living people)
Place of birth missing (living people)
New York College of Music alumni
21st-century American women